Jane Isobel Millar, OBE, FBA, FAcSS (born 7 July 1953) is Professor of Social Policy and was previously the Pro-Vice Chancellor Research, University of Bath. Her research focuses on policy, families, and social security. She is a member of the Council of the Academy of Social Sciences.

Recognition
Elected a Fellow of the British Academy (2014) 
Awarded Officer of the Order of the British Empire (2001) for services to social policy research and teaching.
Elected to Academy of Social Sciences (2000).
Elected Fellow of the Royal Society of Arts
Elected Fellow of the Higher Education Academy

References

Academics of the University of Bristol
Fellows of the British Academy
Officers of the Order of the British Empire
Living people
Fellows of the Academy of Social Sciences
1953 births